Cardiology: International Journal of Cardiovascular Medicine, Surgery, Pathology and Pharmacology is a monthly peer-reviewed medical journal published by Karger. The editor is Dan Atar. It was established in 1937 as Cardiologia by Bruno Kisch and Wilhelm Löffler. From 1971, the journal was published under the name Cardiology and in 2005 it incorporated the medical journal Heart Drug and obtained its current name.

Scope
The journal covers clinical, pre-clinical, and fundamental research as well as topical comprehensive reviews in selected areas of cardiovascular disease. Following the incorporation of the journal Heart Drug, Cardiology has included coverage of issues relating to cardiovascular clinical pharmacology and drug trials.

Abstracting and indexing
The journal is abstracted and indexed in:
 Current Contents/Life Sciences
 PubMed/MEDLINE
 Biological Abstracts
 Excerpta Medica
 Science Citation Index
According to the Journal Citation Reports, the journal had a 2015 impact factor of 1.994.

References

External links
 

Cardiology journals
Monthly journals
Publications established in 1937
English-language journals
Karger academic journals